The banknotes of the Thai baht are part of the physical form of Thailand's currency, Thai baht. The issuance of the baht banknotes is managed by the Bank of Thailand. Throughout its history, the denominations have ranged from 1 baht to 100,000 baht. The circulating banknotes today in Thailand, however, are ranged from 20 baht, 50 baht, 100 baht, 500 baht and 1000 baht. The currently circulating series are 17th, 16th and 15th series. Thai baht banknotes commonly include the portrait or the picture of the sculpture of its kings. The obverses have been designed with the current king's portrait. Whilst, in the reverses, mostly the picture of notable kings and kings with the title "the great". Some reverses feature the King Bhumibol's sayings.

History 
After 1857, notes for 20 and 40 ticals were issued, also bearing their values in Straits dollars and Indian rupees. Undated notes were also issued before 1868 for 5, 7, 8, 12, and 15 tamlueng, and 1 chang. One att notes were issued in 1874.

In 1892, the treasury contracted with Giesecke & Devrient in Germany to print notes for 1, 5, 10, 40, 80, 100, 400, and 800 ticals, called "baht" in the Thai text. They were delivered to the Siamese Treasury, but never issued. Eventually the notes held in reserve were destroyed, with only a few remainders saved.

The year 1902 marked the introduction of reforms by prince Jayanta Mongkol after his observations of banking practices in Europe, which became an important landmark in the inauguration of paper money in Thailand. On September 19, 1902, the government introduced notes which were printed by Thomas De La Rue & Company Limited, England, during the reigns of Kings Rama V and Rama VI, denominated  5, 10, 20, 100, and 1000 ticals, still called baht in the Thai text — each denomination having many types, with 1 and 50 tical notes following in 1918. In 1925, notes were issued in denominations of 1, 5, 10, 20, 100, and 1,000 baht with the denomination in both Arabic and Thai numerals without English text; English speakers continued to refer to these as "ticals".

In 1942, the Bank of Thailand was founded and took over responsibility for the issuance of paper money. 50 baht notes were briefly reintroduced in 1945, with 50 satang notes issued in 1946. The one baht note was replaced by a coin in 1957 and the five baht was replaced in 1972. 50 baht notes were again reintroduced in 1985, with the 10 baht note replaced by a coin in 1988. The EURion constellation has been used on the reverse of 100 and 1000 baht notes since 2003. Older notes are occasionally still found in circulation, for example, 10 baht notes, and these can usually be spent without problem. In any case, they can be exchanged for free in banks.

15th series 
The 15th series are the oldest circulating banknotes in Thailand. They were issued throughout the year 2003 – 2005. The banknotes can still be seen and used in common manners.

16th series

16th series (special)
In 2016, after the passing of King Bhumibol, the Bank of Thailand issued the special series "The tribute to the great King Bhumibol". The reverses are replaced with the portrait of King Bhumibol through his life. The banknotes were rare at the first time being issued. As of 2018, however, the bills are commonly found and circulated in Thailand. Some Thais even mistakenly thought these were the new permanent series of banknotes.

17th series
The 17th series banknotes are the current ones issued for circulation in Thailand from 2018 on. Since the Thai ritual of printing the current king's portrait on the obverse, the King Bhumibol's passing leading the Bank of Thailand to reissue the new version featuring the new king, Vajiralongkorn's portrait. The banknotes's reverses are designed on the idea of the ten kings in the Chakri dynasty's contributions and works on improving the country. Each note's reverse contains two kings and their works, sorting from the Rama I to Rama X, from the 20 baht to 1,000 baht, accordingly.

On 24 March 2022, the 20 baht banknote was reissued as a polymer banknote. The 20 baht was selected to be changed from paper to polymer to improve the quality as it is the most widely used banknote and hence quickly gets soiled and damaged. The new banknote has the same design as before with some additional polymer-note security features.

The pictures displayed within the kings' portrait are the moment of each's works which could be described as follows:
 Kings Phra Buddha Yodfa Chulaloke: The Grand Palace and Wat Phra Kaew represent his founding of the house of Chakri and the beginning of the Rattanakosin period. The two sites sit as the main hub and icon for the establishing of Bangkok.
 King Phra Buddha Loetla Nabhalai: the mural of a scene from Enau represents his keen in literature, the Enau was translated and re-written as Thai poems from Javanese "Panji" by himself. During his reign, Siam was in the golden age of literature.
 King Nangkhlao: Chinese junk represents his keen in trading with China as being called "Jao Sua" (เจ้าสัว), meaning the wealthy one.
 King Mongkut: Khao Wang in Phetchaburi represents his dedication in astrology, making him the father of science for Thai. Khao Wang is the site of palaces and temple built by him, the site includes an observer as well.
 King Chulalongkorn, the great: his royal trip to Russia, visiting the Tsar Nicholas II represents his great effort of pioneering the bonding relationships with western empires.
 King Vajiravudh: his horse riding, marking the founding of Thai boy scout (Luk Suae - ลูกเสือ) and the Wild Tiger Corps (Kong Suae Pah - กองเสือป่า). The event also means his dedication to improving the education in Thailand, asides from establishing the Thai boy scout, he founded the first university of the kingdom, Chulalongkorn University.
 King Prajadhipok: The declaration of the first constitution, as a result of Siamese revolution of 1932. He was the first king to be under the constitutional monarchy regime, marking the end of the long absolute monarchy in Thailand.
 King Mahidol: The royal visit of Sampheng neighbourhood with his brother, Prince Bhumibol at the time. Sampheng is the major Thai-Chinese hub in Bangkok, his visit marked the acceptance of the Thai-Chinese population in Thailand for the first time in centuries.
 King Bhumibol: his visit to Nakhon Phanom province, accepting a lotus from the elder Thoum. The picture is iconic throughout Thailand, indicating his kindness visiting people in rural Thailand and his humility to the elders.

Commemorative notes 
In addition to the banknotes currently in circulation, numerous commemorative notes have been issued:
 5 baht (1969): Date of the inauguration of the note printing works, Bank of Thailand (commemorative text added to regular 5 baht notes)
 10 baht (1969): Date of the inauguration of the note printing works, Bank of Thailand (commemorative text added to regular 10 baht notes)
 60 baht (1987): King Bhumibol Adulyadej's 60th birthday
 50 baht (1990): Princess mother Srinagarindra's 90th birthday (commemorative text added to regular 50 baht notes)
 500 baht (1990): Princess mother Srinagarindra's 90th birthday (commemorative text added to regular 500 baht notes)
 1000 baht (1992): Queen Sirikit's 60th birthday (commemorative text added to regular 1000 baht notes)
 10 baht (1996): 120th anniversary of the ministry of finance (commemorative text added to regular 10 baht notes)
 50 baht (1996): King Bhumibol Adulyadej's 50th anniversary of accession to the throne (polymer note)
 500 baht (1996): King Bhumibol Adulyadej's 50th anniversary of accession to the throne (polymer note)
 500 baht (1996): King Bhumibol Adulyadej's 50th anniversary of accession to the throne (a different emblem)
 1000 baht (1999): King Bhumibol Adulyadej's 72nd birthday (a different emblem)
 50 baht (2000): 50th anniversary of royal wedding of King Bhumibol Adulyadej and Queen Sirikit
 500,000 baht (2000): 50th anniversary of royal wedding of King Bhumibol Adulyadej and Queen Sirikit
 100 baht (2002): The centenary of the issuance of Thai banknotes
 100 baht (2004): Queen Sirikit's 72nd birthday
 60 baht (2006): 60th Anniversary Celebrations of Bhumibol Adulyadej's Accession to the throne
 16 baht (2007): King Bhumibol Adulyadej's 80th birthday (1, 5, 10 baht)
 100 baht (2010): King Bhumibol Adulyadej's 60th anniversary of coronation day and the 60th anniversary of the wedding of the King and Queen Sirikit
 100 baht (2011): King Bhumibol Adulyadej's 84th birthday
 80 baht (2012): Queen Sirikit's 80th birthday
 100 baht (2012): Crown Prince Maha Vajiralongkorn's 5th Cycle (60th) birthday
 100 baht (2015): Princess Maha Chakri Sirindhorn's 5th Cycle (60th) birthday
 70 baht (2016): 70th anniversary of King Bhumibol Adulyadej's accession to the throne
 500 baht (2016): Queen Sirikit's 7th cycle (84th) birthday
 20 to 1,000 baht (2017): In remembrance of King Bhumibol Adulyadej.
 100 baht (2020): The 1st anniversary of the Royal Coronation Ceremony of Maha Vajiralongkorn (Rama X).
 1,000 baht (2020): The 1st anniversary of the Royal Coronation Ceremony of Maha Vajiralongkorn (Rama X).

References

See also 

 20 baht note
 50 baht note
 100 baht note
 500 baht note
 1000 baht note

Currencies of Thailand
Banknotes of Thailand